Weng im Gesäuse is a former municipality in the district of Liezen in the Austrian state of Styria. Since the 2015 Styria municipal structural reform, it is part of the municipality Admont.

Geography
Weng im Gesäuse lies in the eastern Admont basin in the Gesäuse National Park.

References

Ennstal Alps
Cities and towns in Liezen District